Juba is a village in Võru Parish, Võru County, in southeastern Estonia, located about 4 km southwest of the town of Võru. It borders the Lake Vagula in the north.

The inactive Valga–Pechory railway passes through Juba before the Lake Vagula, there's a station named "Vagula".

References

Villages in Võru County